Catherine "Beba" Stratakis (born 12 September 1978), known in Greece as Kalliopi Stratakis, is an American-born Greek former footballer who played as a defender. She has been a member of the Greece women's national team.

College career
Stratakis attended the Southern Connecticut State University in New Haven, Connecticut.

Club career
Stratakis played for Ergotelis.

International career
Stratakis played for Greece at senior level in the 2004 Summer Olympics.

See also
 Greece at the 2004 Summer Olympics

References

External links
 
 

1978 births
Living people
Women's association football defenders
Greek women's footballers
Greece women's international footballers
Olympic footballers of Greece
Footballers at the 2004 Summer Olympics
American women's soccer players
Soccer players from New York (state)
Sportspeople from Nassau County, New York
People from Elmont, New York
American people of Greek descent
Sportspeople of Greek descent
Citizens of Greece through descent
College women's soccer players in the United States
Southern Connecticut State University alumni